August Vaga (March 15, 1893 in Kehra – December 11, 1960 in Tartu) was an Estonian and Soviet botanist. Much of his research into botany was conducted in Tartu, and he was affiliated with the Estonian Institute of Zoology and Botany from its founding in 1947 to 1952.

References

External links
Open Library

1893 births
1960 deaths
People from Kehra
People from the Governorate of Estonia
Members of the Estonian Academy of Sciences
University of Tartu alumni
Academic staff of the University of Tartu

Recipients of the Order of the Red Banner of Labour
Botanists with author abbreviations
20th-century Estonian botanists
Soviet botanists
Eesti Loodus editors